Ellishadder is a crofting township, situated close to the north shore of the freshwater Loch Mealt, on the Trotternish peninsula of the island of Skye, and is in the Scottish council area of Highland. Ellishadder is one of 23 townships making up the district area of Staffin. 

Kilt Rock has a waterfall, Mealt Falls, created from the outflow of Loch Mealt

Notes

Populated places in the Isle of Skye